The Ambassador of the United Kingdom to the United Arab Emirates is the United Kingdom's foremost diplomatic representative in the United Arab Emirates (UAE), and head of the UK's diplomatic mission in the UAE.  The official title is His Britannic Majesty's Ambassador to the United Arab Emirates.

Before the UAE was granted independence from the United Kingdom in 1971, each of the Trucial States was home to its own political deputation from the United Kingdom, with its own Political Officer or Political Agent heading the deputation.  Of these deputations and political representatives, the oldest and most important was to the Emir of Abu Dhabi, who was based in the city of Abu Dhabi, now the capital city of the UAE and the site of the modern British embassy.

The UK also maintains an embassy in Dubai, subordinate to the Abu Dhabi embassy, headed by a Consul General.

List of heads of mission

Political Officers in Abu Dhabi
1955–1958: Martin Buckmaster
1958–1959: Edric Worsnop
1959–1961: Edward Henderson

Political Agents in Abu Dhabi
1961–1965: Sir Hugh Boustead
1965–1968: Sir Archie Lamb
1968–1968: E. F. Henderson
1968–1971: James Treadwell

Ambassadors to the United Arab Emirates
1971–1973: James Treadwell
1973–1977: Donal McCarthy
1977–1981: Sir David Roberts
1981–1986: Sir Harold Walker
1986–1989: Michael Tait
1990–1994: Sir Graham Burton
1994–1998: Anthony Harris
1998–2003: Patrick Nixon
2003–2006: Richard Makepeace
2006–2010: Edward Oakden
2010–2014: Dominic Jermey
2014–2018: Philip Parham

2018–: Patrick Moody

References

External links
UK and United Arab Emirates, gov.uk
British Embassy Dubai, gov.uk

United Arab Emirates
 
United Kingdom